Thomas R. Proctor High School is the only high school in the Utica City School District in Utica, New York. The school was built in 1934 with funds from the U.S. Works Progress Administration and Thomas R. Proctor. It opened its doors on September 9, 1936. The school is located within Oneida County. The current school principal is Josh Gifford. The school is the only public high school in Utica due to the closing of Utica Free Academy in 1990. There are currently about 200 full-time teachers and around 3,500 students.

Athletic department

Thomas R. Proctor High School offers a variety of sports for both girls and boys to compete in at varsity and junior varsity levels. The 2007 boys varsity baseball team were class AA NYSPHSAA champions. The varsity cheerleading squad also holds a national title, and placed first in all five of their competitions in the school year of 2007–2008.

College level courses

Besides the core classes, Proctor High School offers various AP classes in: chemistry, physics, biology, English language and composition, English literature, accounting, calculus, European history, and U.S. history. The students must maintain a grade of 65 and above in order to pass any class at Proctor High.

Dual credit programs

Proctor High School also has a dual-credit program through the nearby Mohawk Valley Community College. It gives students a chance to take community college classes in high school and earn a college credits for them. Students must maintain a grade of 75 or above to be eligible to receive college credit for that class. Dual classes include government, precalculus, economics, and statistics.

ESL students

There is a large immigrant population around the area. Many ethnicities exist at Proctor. Over 40 languages are spoken in the school by students who immigrated from Thailand, Myanmar, Bosnia, Russia, Ukraine, and other regions. Since so many students are immigrants, Proctor offers classes with special instruction for them. Many English as a second or foreign language students are taught by teachers who are trained specifically to instruct those students on how they may understand the material better and improve their English. Some students have never spoken English before they came to Proctor High School.

Graduation requirements

There are three available diplomas a student can earn by graduation: a Regents Diploma, an Advanced Regents Diploma, or a Local Diploma
A Regents Diploma can be earned by completing the core classes and passing the English, U.S. history, algebra, biology, and earth science regents courses, which are mandatory by New York State.
An Advanced Regents Diploma is earned after taking and passing more than one regents examination given by NYS. For example, instead of only taking an algebra regents exam, a student must also take a trigonometry regents exam and pass it. Every graduate must earn 22 high school credits, which means completing 22 classes with a 65 or better grade.
A Local Diploma, consists of the basic classes, which are required, without passing the regents exams.

Navy Junior Reserve Officers Training Corp (NJROTC)

There is an NJROTC program in Proctor, which was founded in 2001. Over 300 students are part of the program which is considered a regiment of cadets. Cadets volunteer around the community and learn the importance of leadership. The cadets make trips to about three to five schools a year for regional drill meets where they compete with other JROTC schools in drill, academics, and athletics.

Each year the program holds a "Military Birthday Bash", a military ball, and some traditional naval ceremonies like the "Change of Command Ceremony" and an awards ceremony.

Notable alumni
Michael Arcuri, congressman for New York's 24th congressional district
Joseph Michael, singer (dropped out before graduation)
Dave Cash, former Major League Baseball player
Brianna Kiesel, 2015 WNBA draftee
Tiffany "New York" Pollard, reality star (Flavor of Love, I Love New York, New York Goes to Hollywood)
Will Smith, American football player (New Orleans Saints)
Bianca Devins, internet celebrity

References
Notes

External links
Thomas R. Proctor High School website

Buildings and structures in Utica, New York
Public high schools in New York (state)
Schools in Oneida County, New York